Women Without Men may refer to:

 Women Without Men (1927 film), a 1927 German silent drama film
 Women Without Men (1956 film), a 1956 British drama film
 Women Without Men (novel), a novel from 1990 by Shahrnush Parsipur
 Women Without Men (2009 film), a 2009 film set in Iran during the 1950s based on the novel